Lucille "Lucy" Van Pelt is a fictional character in the syndicated comic strip Peanuts, written and drawn by Charles Schulz. She is the older sister of Linus and Rerun. Lucy is characterized as a "fussbudget", crabby, bossy and opinionated girl who bullies most other characters in the strip, particularly Linus and Charlie Brown.

Personality
Lucy often mocks and intimidates others, especially Charlie Brown and her  younger brother, Linus. She is often the antagonist in a number of the comics. She has moments of tenderness, such as when Linus replies to her despondency over the unfairness of life by saying "Well, for one thing, you have a little brother who loves you." Whereupon Lucy hugs her little brother and bursts into tears.

Although she often torments, teases, and belittles Charlie Brown, she is genuinely fond of him, and their true friendship is obvious throughout the strip. In one storyline, where Linus and Lucy's family move away (temporarily, as it turned out), both Lucy and Charlie Brown become very emotional when they say goodbye to each other. In at least one strip, Charlie Brown gets the better of Lucy. In it, she lectures him about putting his hands in a bowl of popcorn that they're sharing after licking his fingers. The last panel of the strip shows him walking away from her as she sits there with a surprised expression on her face with the bowl of popcorn dumped on her head. Like her brother, she loves sinking into her Sacco chair.

Lucy has an unrequited crush on musical prodigy Schroeder, in part because Schroeder, a one-note (so to speak) character, cared about nothing but Beethoven and playing the piano. Kevin Wong from the blog Kotaku wrote of the relationship: "Over the years, the reader empathized less with Schroeder and more with Lucy, even though she was the initial aggressor in this dysfunctional dynamic. At least she had some skin in the game—she opened herself to rejection every time she leaned on Schroeder’s piano. Schroeder was never open, and at times, he even seemed to take pleasure in his cruel reactions to her flirtations.

"By 1966, Lucy’s relationship with Schroeder bordered on masochistic. She persisted in her efforts to win him over, despite his indifference. During a multi-day, extended storyline during which Lucy and Linus moved away, Schroeder realized he missed her. He couldn’t play his piano without her there. Like Charlie Brown in the storyline, the reader is irritated at Schroeder for his prior callousness and emotional constipation."

Psychiatric booth
Lucy operates a psychiatric booth, parodying the lemonade stand operated by many young children in the United States. Here, she offers advice and psychoanalysis for five cents, most often to an anxious or depressed Charlie Brown. The "advice" is sometimes worthless. Her advice ranges from street smart popular psychology to hilarious obvious truths to insightful investigation. One example is when, while treating Snoopy, Lucy asks him how he related, during his childhood, to the other (if you allow the expression) "dogs" in his family. Needless to say, Snoopy was quick to disallow the expression. Another is when she asks him to give her his paw and recite to himself: "I am loved. I am needed. I am important." Snoopy reacts by thinking "I am blushing!" 

A sign on the front of the booth declares that "The Doctor is" in or out, depending on which side of the "In/Out" placard is displayed. In A Charlie Brown Christmas, Lucy reverses the placard from displaying its "Out" side to reveal the words "Real In".

Baseball
On Charlie Brown's baseball team Lucy plays right field (or occasionally center field), and is characterized as a bad player, who, when temporarily kicked off the team, turns to heckling the games. Lucy has a knack for coming up with a nonsensical excuse for every fly ball she misses, such as "The moons of Saturn got in my eyes" or "I think there were toxic substances coming from my glove, and they made me dizzy." Other times, she finds an excuse to have one-sided conversations with Charlie Brown at the pitcher's mound, often over some trivial thing she noticed, which usually result in Charlie Brown blowing his top and yelling at her to "Get back in right field where you belong!"

History
The third new character in Peanuts after Violet and Schroeder, Lucy made her debut on March 3, 1952. Originally based on Schulz's adopted daughter Meredith, Lucy was a goggle-eyed toddler who continually annoyed her parents and the older kids. Her future irascibility was hinted at in a 1953 strip when she tells Charlie Brown that she'd just been expelled from nursery school.  Over the next two years, she aged up so that by 1954, she appeared to be about the same age as Charlie Brown. (The early strips with toddler-age Lucy were not reprinted until after Charles Schulz's death.) Within a few months of her introduction, Schulz altered Lucy's eyes to have the same appearance as that of the other characters, except for small extra lines around them which were also later sported by her two siblings.

Lucy has short, black hair and wears a blue dress with blue socks and saddle shoes until the late 1970s when Schulz began showing the strip's female characters in pants and shirts in order to keep their outfits more contemporary. By the late 1980s, she had switched to this look permanently.

Lucy was named after Louanne Van Pelt, a former neighbor of Charles Schulz in Colorado Springs and, according to David Michaelis of Time Magazine, was modeled after Schulz's first wife, Joyce.

In a 1967 interview with Psychology Today, Schulz said that his favorite characters were Snoopy, Linus and Charlie Brown. "Lucy is not a favorite, because I don't especially like her, that's all. But she works, and a central comic-strip character is not only one who fills his role very well, but who will provide ideas by the very nature of his personality." Also in the article, Schulz added that Lucy was mean, because supposedly weak people dominating strong people is funny: "There is nothing funny about a little boy being mean to a little girl. That is simply not funny! But there is something funny about a little girl being able to be mean to a little boy." 
He continues: "You have to give (Lucy) credit though; she has a way of cutting right down to the truth. This is one of her good points. She can cut through a lot of the sham and she can really feel what's wrong with Charlie Brown which he can't see himself."

Annual football strips

Lucy frequently pulls the football away from Charlie Brown right as he is about to kick it.

The first occasion on which she did this was November 16, 1952 (Violet unintentionally did the same thing a year before because she was afraid Charlie Brown would accidentally kick her), but unlike subsequent stunts, Lucy first pulled the ball away because she did not want Charlie Brown to get it dirty (he took a second try in the same strip, only to trip over it at the end).

The football strips became an annual tradition, and Schulz did one nearly every year for the rest of the strip's run, becoming a core part of Peanuts lore. One infamous example of this is the animated special It's Your First Kiss, Charlie Brown, where her actions (she pulled the ball away four times) cost the school football team a win in the Homecoming game, yet Charlie Brown is blamed even though he is clearly not at fault. Charlie Brown did in fact kick the football in the September 12, 1956 strip, but only because Schroeder was holding the ball. In a July–August 1979 story when Charlie Brown checked himself into the hospital due to feeling ill, Lucy was so distraught at Charlie Brown in that state that she vowed that she would let Charlie Brown kick the football. When Charlie Brown was released, he kept her to that vow. Unfortunately, when Charlie Brown made his place kick, he missed the ball and hit her hand instead.

Voiced by

Karen Mendelson (1963)
Tracy Stratford (1963, 1965)
Sally Dryer (1966–1968)
Pamelyn Ferdin (1969–1971)
Robin Kohn (1972–1973)
Melanie Kohn (1974–1975, 1977)
Sarah Beach (1976)
Lynn Mortensen (1976)
Michelle Muller (1977–1979)
Laura Planting (1980)
Kristen Fullerton (1980)
Sydney Penny (1981)
Angela Lee (1983)
Heather Stoneman (1984–1985)
Jessica Lee Smith (1984–1985)
Melissa Guzzi (1986)
Tiffany Billings (1986–1988)
Ami Foster (1988)
Erica Gayle (1988–1989)
Jennifer Banko (1990)
Marne Patterson (1992)
Molly Dunham (1993)
Jamie Cronin (1995–1997)
Rachel Davey (2000)
Lauren Schaffel (2002)
Serena Berman (2002–2003)
Ashley Rose Orr (2003)
Stephanie Patton (2006)
Michelle Creber (2008–2009)
Grace Rolek (2011)
Hadley Belle Miller (2015)
Bella Stine (2016)
Merrit Grove (2018–2019)
Isabella Leo (2019–present)

Source(s):

In popular culture
 In the Peanuts sequence of the Muppet Babies (1984 TV series) episode "Comic Capers", Piggy is imagined as Lucy. A clip of her from a currently unknown media where she says "Wait until you get my bill" plays after her scene.
 Lucy, along with other Peanuts characters made appearances on Family Guy. Her most recent appearance is in "Brian's Got a Brand New Bag". Peter Griffin appeared in front of Lucy and, fed up with her pulling the football trick on Charlie Brown, roundhouse kicked her repeatedly. Lucy finally complied to his demands and let Charlie Brown kick the football.
 Numbuh 1/Nigel Uno wears an outfit completely identical to Lucy on Codename: Kids Next Door episode, Operation: F.U.T.U.R.E.

References

Peanuts characters
Female characters in animation
Female characters in comics
Comics characters introduced in 1952
Child characters in animated films
Child characters in comics
Child characters in musical theatre
Fictional baseball players
Fictional American psychiatrists
Fictional bullies
Child characters in television